Moonlight Madness is the second studio album by singer Teri DeSario, released in 1979 by Casablanca Records and Filmworks (NBLP-7178). It includes the hit single "Yes, I'm Ready", a duet with K.C. of KC and the Sunshine Band.

The album contains mostly disco music, including "Dancin' in the Streets" and "I'm Ready".

Track listing

Personnel
Recorded at Westlake Audio, Los Angeles and Devonshire Studios, Los Angeles

Musicians
Teri DeSario – main artist, vocals (lead and backing)
Sid Sharp – concertmaster
Al Ciner, Mitch Holder, Snuffy Walden – guitars
Dennis Belfield – bass guitar
Michael Boddicker, Harry Wayne Casey, Tom Hensley, Michael Lang, Bill Purse – keyboards
Carlos Vega – drums
Paulinho Da Costa and Alan Estes – percussion
Vincent DeRosa – French horn
Joey Carbone, H.W. Casey, Patricia Henderson, and Julia and Maxine Waters – backing vocals
Gary Herbig, Jim Horn, and Kim Hutchcroft – saxophone
Michael Boddicker – synthesizer
Dick Hyde – trombone
Jerry Hey, Steve Madaio and Dalton Smith – trumpet

Production
H.W. Casey – production and management
Erick Zobler – audio engineering
Mixed at Devonshire Studios by Humberto Gatica and Mike Mancini (assistant)
SNB – mastering
Don Foster – management
Shaun Harris – contractor
Harry Langdon – photography
Edward Beckett and Gribbitt! – design
Alice Gellis – wardrobe
Armando Cosio – hair and make-up

Additional album credits
Strings and rhythm sections arranged by Bill Purse, horns section arranged by Jerry Hey.

Side 1
Teri Desario-Bill Purse. Blitfistly Music (BMI)
Joey Carbone Resurrection Music Inc.
Joey Carbone-Karen Tobin Resurrection Music/Sixty-Ninth Street Music (BMI)
Frannie Golde, Albert Hammond Albert Hammond Music (ASCAP) Braintree Music/Goldie's Gold (BMI)
William Stevenson, Marvin Gaye, Ivy Hunter Jobete Music Company Inc.

Side 2
Lionel Azulay Carbet Music/Harrick music Inc.
Joey Carbone, Richie Zito, Larry McNally Resurrection Music/Sixty-Ninth Street Music (BMI)/McNally Music Publishing (ASCAP)
Words by Carol Bayer Sager Music by Marvin Hamlisch Chappel Music/Red Buller Music/Begonia Melodies (BMI)
Barbara Mason Dandelion Music Co. (BMI)
H.W. Casey, Bill Purse, Teri Desario Harrick Music/Sherlyn Music/Blitfistly Music (BMI)

References

External links

1979 albums
Casablanca Records albums
Teri DeSario albums